De La Rose (1978–2001) was an American Thoroughbred racehorse. Bred in Kentucky, she was the daughter of English Triple Crown champion Nijinsky. Her grandsire was U.S. Racing Hall of Fame inductee Northern Dancer, and her damsire was another U.S. Hall of Famer, Round Table. She was purchased and raced by Henryk de Kwiatkowski, who later acquired the famed Calumet Farm in Lexington, Kentucky.

De La Rose, was voted the 1981 Eclipse Award for Outstanding Female Turf Horse, Retired to broodmare duty, she produced seven foals. On March 6, 2001, at age twenty-three, De La Rose was euthanized due to infirmities of old age.

References
 De La Rose's pedigree and partial racing stats

1978 racehorse births
2001 racehorse deaths
Racehorses bred in Kentucky
Racehorses trained in the United States
Eclipse Award winners
Thoroughbred family 26